thumb|The Late Al Arnaout.
Shuaib ibn Muharram al-Albani al-Arnauti (in Arabicشعيب بن محرم الألباني الأرناؤوطي  ) (2016-1928) was a well known Albanian scholar of Hadith in the Islamic World. He was famous for his works on Hadith Methodology, Manuscript Investigation and Research and Hadith Criticism. his Kunya is Abu Usamah,

Biography
He was born in Damascus Syria in the year 1928. His family were originally from Albania but immigrated to Syria before his birth. Al Arnaout  followed the Hanafi school of Jurisprudence. Although he is most well known for his work on Hadith Literature, Al Arnaout was a strong proponent of Sunni Orthodoxy and following the four Madhhabs. He died in October 27, 2016.

Works
His most notable work was as chief editor of a 45 volume work on the Musnad of Ahmad Ibn Hanbal in which he investigated various manuscripts, cross-referenced with other Hadith books and critiqued over 28,000 Hadiths.  His 16 volume work on Tahawi Sharh mushkil al-athar (The Explanation of Problematic Hadiths) and on Ibn Qayyim al-Jawziyya Zad al-Ma'ad (Provisions of the Afterlife). Beyond those, he wrote several less known works on Hadith Methodology, Manuscript Investigation and Hadith Criticism.

References

1928 births
2016 deaths
Syrian people of Albanian descent
20th-century Syrian people
21st-century Syrian people
Syrian Sunni Muslim scholars of Islam
Hadith scholars
Hanafi fiqh scholars
Asharis
Biographical evaluation scholars